Crassula colligata is a herb in the family Crassulaceae that is native to Western Australia.

It is commonly found on cliffs, scarps, in gullies, behind dunes and near salt lakes along the south coast in the Great Southern, Wheatbelt and Goldfields-Esperance regions.

References

colligata
Plants described in 2002
Eudicots of Western Australia
Saxifragales of Australia